No Protection is the second studio album by American rock band Starship. It was released on June 29, 1987, by Grunt Records and RCA Records. The album featured the number-one single "Nothing's Gonna Stop Us Now", and the top-10 single "It's Not Over ('Til It's Over)", The former of which appears in the fantasy comedy film Mannequin and the latter of which was a tune originally performed the previous year by one-time Manfred Mann's Earth Band frontman Chris Thompson for the soundtrack to the film Playing for Keeps. Third single "Beat Patrol" was #46 on Billboard's Hot 100.

This was the last album which was released through Grunt Records, and the final Starship album to feature vocalist Grace Slick, who left the band in 1988 and rejoined Jefferson Airplane for their reunion tour and self-titled reunion album, Jefferson Airplane, in 1989. The Diane Warren-penned ballad "Set the Night to Music" was covered in 1991 as a duet between R&B singer Roberta Flack and reggae singer Maxi Priest, released as a single from Flack's album Set the Night to Music.

Cash Box said that the single "It's Not Over ('Til It's Over)" is "a soaring, anthemic rocker with a winning chorus."

Track listing

Personnel
Mickey Thomas – lead vocals (1-6, 8, 9, 11), backing vocals (1, 2, 6, 7, 10, 11)
Grace Slick – lead vocals (1, 2, 6, 7, 10, 11), backing vocals (1-6, 8, 9, 11)
Craig Chaquico – guitar (1, 2 (lead guitar/solo), 3-11), backing vocals (5, 8-11)
Donny Baldwin – electronic drums (1, 3, 4, 7, 8, 11), drums (5-7, 9, 11), backing vocals (2, 4, 7-11) 

Additional personnel
Pete Sears – bass (2)
Peter Wolf – keyboards (1, 4-7, 11), synth bass (1, 5, 6), bass (4, 7, 11)
Larry Williams – keyboards (10)
Bill Cuomo – keyboards (3), synth bass (8), bass (3)
Alan Pasqua – keyboards (8, 9), synth bass (10)
Walter Afanasieff – keyboards (2)
Corrado Rustici – charvel MIDI guitar (2)
Narada Michael Walden – electronic drums (2)
Bongo Bob – percussion (2)
Bret Bloomfield, Maxi Anderson, Siedah Garrett, Sharon Hendrix, Phillip Ingram, Clif Magness, Jeff Pescetto, Oren Waters, Ina Wolf – backing vocals (6, 11)
Tommy Funderburk – backing vocals (3, 9, 10)
Kitty Beethoven, Jim Gilstrap – backing vocals (2)

Production
Peter Wolf – producer (1, 4-7, 11)
Keith Olsen – producer (3, 8-10)
Narada Michael Walden – producer (2)
Brian Malouf – engineer for Peter Wolf
Ed Thacker, Dan Garcia, John VanNess – additional engineers for Peter Wolf
Brian Foraker – engineer for Keith Olsen
David Frazer – engineer for Narada Michael Walden
Bino Espinoza, Dana Chapelle, David Luke, Steve Holroyd, Steve Krause, Ron Dasilva – assistant engineers
Starship – arrangements (3, 8, 9)
Larry Williams – arrangements (10)
Skip Johnson – production coordinator
Bernie Grundman – mastering engineer
Raess Design (Ted Raess) – art direction
Jeff Katz – photographer
Lisa Marie Avila – make up
Recorded at Lighthouse Studios, Goodnight L. A., Tarpan Studios, Soundcastle Recording Studio, Fantasy Studios, Manzanita Studios
Mixed at Image Recorders
"Nothing's Gonna Stop Us Now" mixed at Tarpan Studios
Mastered at Bernie Grundman Mastering
Michael Hill – reissue liner notes
Dalita Keumurian – reissue project director
Bill Lacey – reissue audio restoration
Paul Williams – reissue coordination vocal

Charts

Weekly charts

Year-end charts

Certifications

References

1987 albums
Albums produced by Keith Olsen
Albums produced by Narada Michael Walden
Grunt Records albums
RCA Records albums
Starship (band) albums